Noriko Yui is a professor of mathematics at Queen's University in Kingston, Ontario.

Career
A native of Japan, Yui obtained her B.S. from Tsuda College, and her Ph.D. in Mathematics from Rutgers University in 1974 under the supervision of Richard Bumby.

Known internationally, Yui has been a visiting researcher at the Max-Planck-Institute in Bonn a number of times and a Bye-Fellow at Newnham College, University of Cambridge. Her research is based in arithmetic geometry with applications to mathematical physics and notably mirror symmetry. Currently, much of her work is focused upon the modularity of Calabi-Yau threefolds.

Professor Yui has been the managing editor for the journal Communications in Number Theory and Physics since its inception in 2007. She has edited a number of monographs, and she has co-authored two books.

References

External links
Notable books co-authored by Yui

Living people
Year of birth missing (living people)
Japanese emigrants to Canada
Rutgers University alumni
Academic staff of Queen's University at Kingston
Tsuda University alumni
21st-century Japanese mathematicians
Canadian women mathematicians
21st-century Canadian mathematicians
21st-century women mathematicians